Burwood may refer to:

Australia
Burwood, Victoria, Australia, a suburb of Melbourne
Burwood railway station, Melbourne
Electoral district of Burwood, an electoral district in Victoria
Burwood, New South Wales, Australia, a suburb of Sydney
Burwood railway station, Sydney
Electoral district of Burwood (New South Wales), a former electoral district in New South Wales

New Zealand
Burwood, New Zealand, a suburb of Christchurch

United Kingdom
Burwood, Shropshire, a location in the United Kingdom
Burwood Park, an area in north Surrey

United States
 Burwood, Tennessee